Heshan District is a district of the city of Hebi, Henan province, China.

Administrative divisions
As 2012, this district is divided to 5 subdistricts , 1 town and 1 township.
Subdistricts

Towns
Hebiji

Townships
Jijiashan Township

References

County-level divisions of Henan
Hebi